is a 1987 video game that simulates the traditional game of bowling. The MSX version was released for both the MSX-1 and the MSX-2 generations of the computer.

Up to five players can play on any of the 30 bowling lanes available; simulating the concept of being in a bowling league. Players can change their lane positioning, determine how strong the throw is, and even make the ball go through various curves (or even through a straight ball into the pins).

References

External links
Dynamite Bowl flyer at Giant Bomb

1987 video games
Bowling video games
Japan-exclusive video games
MSX games
NEC PC-8801 games
Nintendo Entertainment System games
Toshiba EMI games
Multiplayer and single-player video games
MSX2 games
Video games developed in Japan